Eden Hills railway station is located on the Belair line. Situated in the Adelaide southern foothills suburb of Eden Hills, it is 14.2 kilometres from Adelaide station.

History 
Eden Hills is the only station on the Adelaide Metro to have a tunnel on both approaches. The original line through Eden Hills was opened in 1883, as part of the Adelaide to Nairne railway. However, this station was not opened until 1 April 1912 and originally named Eden. Prior to that, there was no station between Mitcham and Blackwood, although the train would slow through Eden Hills, allowing passengers to drop off parcels and bags to persons standing along the line. The station once had a ticket office and shelter on the former eastern platform, like the one at Long Gully, and a shelter on the western platform.

The western platform shelter and ticket office were demolished in 1984 The shelter on the eastern platform was replaced in 2009. As part of the renewal of the Belair line in 2009, improvements to access ramps, seating, fencing, lighting, signage and safety markings have taken place at Eden Hills.

Services by platform

References

External links

Railway stations in Adelaide
Railway stations in Australia opened in 1911